Louis Côté (September 13, 1890 – February 2, 1943) was an Ontario lawyer and political figure. He represented Ottawa East in the Legislative Assembly of Ontario as a Conservative from 1929 to 1934 and was also a Conservative member of the Senate of Canada for Ottawa East division from 1933 to 1943.

Biography
He was born in Ottawa in 1890 and studied at the University of Ottawa and Osgoode Hall. Côté married Stella, the daughter of judge Ernest Cimon and granddaughter of Hector-Louis Langevin, in 1922. He was a member of the Scott-Merchant-Côté Commission which recommended the creation of a bilingual school system for Franco-Ontarians.

Côté died of a heart attack at Ottawa's Union train station in 1943 while still serving as a senator.

References 
 Histoire d'Ottawa et de sa population canadienne-française, vol 4, 1926–1950, G. Lamoureux (1989)

External links 
 
 
La Commission Scott-Merchant-Côté

1890 births
1956 deaths
Canadian senators from Ontario
Conservative Party of Canada (1867–1942) senators
Politicians from Ottawa
Progressive Conservative Party of Ontario MPPs